The 2004 Big Ten men's basketball tournament was the postseason men's basketball tournament for the Big Ten Conference and was played between March 11 and March 14, 2004 at Conseco Fieldhouse in Indianapolis, Indiana. The championship was won by Wisconsin who defeated Illinois in the championship game. As a result, Wisconsin received the Big Ten's automatic bid to the NCAA tournament.  The win marked Wisconsin's first win in their first appearance in the championship game. It also marked the first time in tournament history that the top two seeds appeared in the championship game.

Seeds
All Big Ten schools played in the tournament. Teams were seeded by conference record, with a tiebreaker system used to seed teams with identical conference records. Seeding for the tournament was determined at the close of the regular conference season. The top five teams received a first round bye.

Bracket

Honors

All-Tournament Team
 Devin Harris, Wisconsin – Big Ten tournament Most Outstanding Player
 Dee Brown, Illinois
 Deron Williams, Illinois
 Jitim Young, Northwestern
 Mike Wilkinson, Wisconsin

References

Big Ten men's basketball tournament
Tournament
Big Ten Conference men's basketball tournament
Big Ten men's basketball tournament
Big Ten